I Don't Speak English is a 1995 Italian comedy film directed by Carlo Vanzina.

A sequel entitled Banzai was released in 1997.

Cast
Paolo Villaggio as Sergio Colombo
Paola Quattrini as Paola Colombo
Laura Migliacci as Betta Colombo
Ian Price as Frederick Livingstone
Carolyn Pickles as Linda Livingstone
Chiara Noschese as Patrizia
Giorgio Biavati as Giovanni
Stefania Spugnini as Francesca
Maurizio Marsala as Giovanni Spadella
Mario Bianco as Tony Pinardi
Mauro La Giglia as Alfredo Della Torre
Matteo Dondi as Cesare Scotto
Matteo Pagano as Dario Scotto

Reception
I Don't Speak English opened at number six at the Italian box office and reached number one in its third week of release.

References

External links

1995 films
Films directed by Carlo Vanzina
Films produced by Fulvio Lucisano
1990s Italian-language films
1995 comedy films
Italian comedy films
1990s Italian films